Tiaan Arno Dorfling (born 26 July 1990) is a South African professional rugby union player, who most recently played for . His regular position is scrum-half.

Career

Youth

Dorfling attended Hoërskool Framesby in Port Elizabeth and earned an inclusion in several Eastern Province youth representative teams; he played for their Under-16 team at the 2006 Grant Khomo Week in Wellington and for their Under-18 side at the 2007 Academy Week held in Pietersburg and the 2008 Academy Week held in George. After the latter tournament, he was also included in a South African Schools Academy side that played against the main South African Schools side in Durban. Dorfling started the match in the fly-half position and kicked two conversions in a 41–19 victory.

Leopards / NWU Pukke

Despite still being eligible to play at Under-19 level, he scored 17 points in eight appearances for a  side that finished bottom of the 2009 Under-21 Provincial Championship Group A log. However, he helped them remain in Group A after they beat  38–27 in a relegation play-off.

At the start of 2011, Dorfling represented  in the Varsity Cup competition. He made six appearances and scored three tries – two of those in a 48–0 victory over the  – for his side, that finished in sixth place on the log, missing out on the play-offs. He then played in the Under-21 Provincial Championship for a third consecutive season, making seven appearances for the Leopards U21 team that finished in sixth place in that competition, but failed to play any first class rugby in 2011.

He started two matches and came on as a replacement in a further two, but again missed out on the play-offs as they finished fifth. The match finished 22–all after the regulation 80 minutes to go to extra time. Despite Dorfling scoring his first senior try in the 98th minute of the match, he again ended on the losing side, with the side from Port Elizabeth running out 32–29 winners.

Dorfling started all nine of the NWU Pukke's matches in the 2014 Varsity Cup; he helped them top the log after winning six of their seven regular season matches, and to reach their first final since 2009 by beating the  19–18 in the semi-final.

He didn't play first class rugby in 2014 and was also too old to play Varsity Cup rugby in 2015.

Griquas

He joined Kimberley-based side  for the 2016 season.

References

South African rugby union players
Living people
1990 births
Rugby union players from Port Elizabeth
Rugby union scrum-halves
Rugby union fly-halves
Griquas (rugby union) players
Leopards (rugby union) players